Mountain Music may refer to:

 Mountain Music (album), an album by Alabama
 "Mountain Music" (song), the title track
 Old-time music or "mountain music", a genre of North American folk music
 Mountain Music (film), a 1937 film featuring Arthur Hohl
 Mountain Music, a 1975 Claymation short film by Will Vinton

See also
 Appalachian music, the traditional music of the American Appalachian Mountains region